Olivia Bouffard-Nesbitt (born 30 August 1992) is a Canadian cross-country skier. She competed at the 2022 Winter Olympics, in Women's 10 kilometre classical, Women's 15 kilometre skiathlon, Women's sprint, and Women's 4 × 5 kilometre relay.

Career

Junior
Bouffard-Nesbitt began her junior career as part of the FIS World U23 Championships team in 2015, with a best placement of 17th in the 10 km event.

Senior
On January 21, 2022, Bouffard-Nesbitt was officially named to Canada's 2022 Olympic team after the FIS awarded Canada a reallocated quota spot.

Cross-country skiing results
All results are sourced from the International Ski Federation (FIS).

Olympic Games

World Championships

World Cup

Season standings

References

1992 births
Living people
Canadian female cross-country skiers
Olympic cross-country skiers of Canada
Cross-country skiers at the 2022 Winter Olympics
21st-century Canadian women